The Nevada–California–Oregon Railway was a  narrow gauge railroad originally planned to connect Reno, Nevada, to the Columbia River. However, only  of track were laid so service never extended beyond Lakeview, Oregon. Because of the company’s reputation for mismanagement, it was often called the "Narrow, Crooked & Ornery" railroad.

History 

The railroad was organized in Reno in June 1880 as the Nevada and Oregon Railroad. It was decided that the best plan was to build north to the Columbia River to service cattle ranches and farms in northeastern California and eastern Oregon. The northern terminus was to be The Dalles, Oregon, since that city was located on the Columbia River and had no eastern or southern rail connections at that time.

The company decided to lay  gauge track because it was cheaper than  construction. Site survey and grading work for the railroad began in December 1880. The first spike was driven in Reno on May 28, 1881.  However, the company was short of money so construction was slow. In addition, the board of directors was plagued by corruption and intrigue. One board meeting actually ended with a gun fight between two members. For a period of time, there were two separate boards of directors trying to run the company.

Regular service between the two cities began a month later. However, track construction remained slow, and the company’s business problems continued to grow. The Moran Brothers bank in New York was the company’s largest investor. In April 1884, the bank took full control of the railroad, purchasing the company at a court ordered auction for just over $372,000. The company spent the next few years improving existing lines and trying to build up local business.

On January 1, 1893, the name of the railroad was changed to the Nevada–California–Oregon.

The next northward extension commenced in 1899. In April 1902, the line reached Madeline, California. The tracks were extended to Likely, California, in October 1907; Alturas, California, in December 1908; and finally, Lakeview, Oregon, on 10 January 1912.  The company planned to continue north through Prineville, Oregon, to The Dalles, with separate branches running west to Klamath Falls and on to the Rogue River Valley, and over the Cascade Mountains to Eugene, Oregon, in the Willamette Valley. However, no further construction ever took place.

Locomotives were converted from wood fuel to oil-burners by 1910. Financially, the railroad's best year was 1913, but decline followed quickly as traffic shifted to the recently completed standard-gauge Western Pacific Railroad and Southern Pacific branch to Susanville. The railroad's last rolling stock purchase was in 1915 when two locomotives, three passenger cars, two mail cars, and 78 freight cars from the dismantled Florence and Cripple Creek Railroad were obtained for the bargain price of $22,750. In 1917, the company began selling branch lines in California. The next year, the Reno station was closed, and the company headquarters and maintenance shop were relocated to Alturas. By 1922, the railroad was in serious financial trouble, and the Moran Bank wanted out of the business. On April 30, 1925, the Southern Pacific Company purchased the company. Several locomotives subsequently ran on the former Carson and Colorado Railroad. One was sold to the Pacific Coast Railway, and later passed to the Oahu Railway and Land Company during World War II.
On October 20, 1985, Southern Pacific abandoned the  section between Lakeview, Oregon and Alturas, California, which is now operated by Lake County Oregon as the Lake County Railroad, running about 20 cars per week in two trips per week. At Alturas it joins with Union Pacific.

Stations 

The Nevada–California–Oregon Railroad built classic brick depots in Reno and Lakeview. A smaller stone masonry station was constructed in Alturas. All three passenger depots still exist, and are listed on the United States National Register of Historic Places along with the locomotive house and machine shop in Reno.  The N-C-O railway office in Alturas and the depot at Lakeview are examples of the 1880s style of architecture known as Mission Revival. The features include solid massive walls with buttressing, broad unadorned wall surfaces, wide projecting eaves, low-pitched tile roofs, corridors with Roman aqueduct-like arches, terraced bell towers and mission belfry facades. (See The Journal of the Modoc County Historical Society, No. 11, 1989.)  The style showed up at Stanford University, the Southern Pacific depot in Santa Barbara and the Mission Inn in Riverside. The architect for many N-C-O buildings was Carl Werner of San Francisco.  However, he did not design the railroad's three main depots.
 Reno depot: The architect for the Reno depot was Frederick DeLongchamps.
 Alturas depot: The Alturas depot was built by Martin and Diamond, no architect is listed on the NRHP.
 Lakeview depot: The Lakeview depot was designed by Frederick DeLongchamps.

Locomotives

Further reading
 
 Myrick, David. Railroads of Nevada and Eastern California (Vol. 1). Howell-North Books, 1962.

References

External links 

High Desert Rails
Lakeview Railroad Passenger Station

Defunct California railroads
Defunct Nevada railroads
Defunct Oregon railroads
Predecessors of the Southern Pacific Transportation Company
3 ft gauge railways in the United States
Narrow gauge railroads in California
Narrow gauge railroads in Nevada
Narrow gauge railroads in Oregon
Railway companies established in 1888
Railway companies disestablished in 1925

1888 establishments in California
1925 disestablishments in California
1888 establishments in Nevada
1925 disestablishments in Nevada
History of Modoc County, California
History of Washoe County, Nevada
History of Reno, Nevada
1925 mergers and acquisitions